Paul Gilding is an Australian environmentalist, consultant, and author. Gilding, a former executive director of Greenpeace International, and a Fellow at University of Cambridge's Institute for Sustainability Leadership, is the author of The Great Disruption: Why the Climate Crisis Will Bring On the End of Shopping and the Birth of a New World (2011). In 2012, Gilding delivered a presentation on the thesis of his book at the 2012 TED conference titled The Earth is Full, which earned him press attention. He lives in southern Tasmania with his wife and children.

Career

Gilding started his career as an activist in his early teens, focusing on South African apartheid and Aboriginal land rights. While serving in the Australian Air Force, he also became involved in the nuclear disarmament movement. According to an interview on AlterNet, Gilding's experience in anti-nuclear politics led to a greater awareness of environmental issues and led him to join Greenpeace in the 1980s, becoming involved in direct actions against corporate polluters. Between 1989 and 1994, Gilding served as the executive director of Greenpeace Australia and, later, Greenpeace International.

Gilding serves on the advisory board of The Climate Mobilization, a grassroots advocacy group calling for a global economic mobilization against climate change on the scale of the American home front during World War II, with the goal of 100% clean energy and net zero greenhouse gas emissions by 2030.

The Great Disruption

In The Great Disruption, Gilding posits that the financial crisis of 2007–2008 is a symptom of human civilization growing beyond Earth's ability to support it, and is tied to the threat posed by climate change and other forms of environmental degradation. Because of this, Gilding calls for an end to the whole concept of exponential economic growth, which he blames for the consumption and waste that has led to both the economic and ecological crises facing mankind and modern civilization.

Furthermore, in a departure from many environmental writers — such as James Lovelock, Clive Hamilton, Richard Heinberg and James Howard Kunstler  — Gilding argues that people will work together through the climate crisis and that humanity as a whole will eventually act in time to save civilization, albeit too late to prevent catastrophic consequences; Gilding bases this argument on the ingenuity of past generations in the midst of crisis, particularly World War II. Gilding also believes that the global economy will fully embrace sustainable energy when societies fully accept the reality of climate change and abandon fossil fuel resources.

See also
 Environmental movement in Australia

References

External links
 PaulGilding.com – official website
 Short biography
 The Earth is Full – a New York Times column by Thomas Friedman discussing the themes of Gilding's book
 

Living people
Australian corporate directors
Australian environmentalists
Australian non-fiction writers
Australian soldiers
Climate activists
Non-fiction environmental writers
People associated with Greenpeace
Sustainability advocates
Year of birth missing (living people)
Place of birth missing (living people)